The National Council on Aging (NCOA) was founded in 1950 as the first charitable organization in the U.S. that would advocate for older Americans with service providers and policymakers. Headquartered in Washington, DC, NCOA brings together various organizations, businesses, and governmental agency to work toward securing jobs, benefits, healthcare, and options for independent and active living among older Americans.

NCOA provides a variety of services to older people and caregivers including Benefits Checkup, Economics Checkup, and My Medicare Matters.

References

Organizations established in 1950
1950 establishments in the United States
Ageism
Seniors' organizations
Political advocacy groups in the United States
Affordable housing advocacy organizations

Non-profit organizations based in Washington, D.C.
501(c)(3) organizations